Barden Cobblestone Farmhouse is a historic home located at Benton in Yates County, New York.  The farmhouse was built about 1843 and is an example of vernacular Greek Revival style, cobblestone domestic architecture. It is a -story, five-bay center-hall building.  It is built of small, multi-colored field cobbles.  Also on the property are two sheds, two wells, and a hitching post.  The farmhouse is among the nine surviving cobblestone buildings in Yates County.

It was listed on the National Register of Historic Places in 1992.

References

Houses on the National Register of Historic Places in New York (state)
Greek Revival houses in New York (state)
Cobblestone architecture in New York (state)
Houses completed in 1843
Houses in Yates County, New York
1843 establishments in New York (state)
National Register of Historic Places in Yates County, New York